The Campero Cabinet constituted the 39th to 41st cabinets of the Republic of Bolivia. It was formed on 20 June 1880, five months after Narciso Campero was installed as the 20th president of Bolivia following the War of the Pacific, succeeding the Daza Cabinet. It was dissolved on 4 September 1884 upon the end of Campero’s term and was succeeded by the Cabinet of Gregorio Pacheco.

Composition

History

References

Notes

Footnotes

Bibliography 

 

1880 establishments in Bolivia
1884 disestablishments in Bolivia
Cabinets of Bolivia
Cabinets established in 1880
Cabinets disestablished in 1884